Theatre of India is one of the most ancient forms of theatre and it features a detailed textual, sculptural, and dramatic effects which emerged in mid first millennium BC. Like in the areas of music and dance, the Indian theatre is also defined by the dramatic performance based on the concept of Nritya, which is a Sanskrit word for drama but encompasses dramatic narrative, virtuosic dance, and music. Historically, Indian theatre has exerted influence beyond its borders, reaching ancient China and other countries in the Far East.

With the Islamic conquests that began in the 10th and 11th centuries, theatre was discouraged or forbidden entirely. Later, in an attempt to re-assert indigenous values and ideas, village theatre was encouraged across the subcontinent, developing in a large number of regional languages from the 15th to the 19th centuries. Modern Indian theatre developed during the period of colonial rule under the British Empire, from the mid-19th century until the mid-20th.

From the last half of the 19th century, theatres in India experienced a boost in numbers and practice. After Indian independence in 1947, theatres spread throughout India as one of the means of entertainment. As a diverse, multi-cultural nation, the theatre of India cannot be reduced to a single, homogenous trend.

In contemporary India, the major competition with its theatre is that represented by growing television industries and the spread of films produced in the Indian film industry based in Mumbai (formerly Bombay), known as "Bollywood". Lack of finance is another major obstacle.

History of Indian theatre

Sanskrit theatre

History of the origin of Theatre in India is severely disputed.

Early dating

According to some scholars, Indian theatre emerged in the 15th century BC. Vedic text such as Rigveda provides evidence of drama plays being enacted during Yagya ceremonies. The dialogues mentioned in the texts range from one person monologues to three person dialogues such as the dialogue between Indra, Indrani and Vrishakapi. The dialogues are not only religious in their context but also secular. For instance, one rigvedic monologue is about a gambler whose life is ruined because of it and has estranged his wife caves dating back to the 3rd century BC  and Khandagiri caves from the 2nd century BC are the earliest examples of theatre architecture in India.

Dating of Bhasa is controversial, it ranges from pre Natyashastra date of the 5th century BC  to the 2nd century AD, Bhasa according to some scholars preceded Natyashastra tradition. Nandikeshvara who wrote Abhinaya Darpana lit. The Mirror of Gesture' which itself was based on the abridgement of a long treatise of 400 sholakas called Bharatarnava, according to some scholars seems to have preceded Bharata. The most concrete example of Nandikeshvara's teachings have survived thanks to Bhasa.

Natyashastra, dated earliest to 200 BC, although mentions various teachers and call them acharya but doesn't name them, but it still ends with a reference to a lost treatise of dramatist Kohala.

Late dating

According to scholars who insist on late dating, Sanskrit theatre emerged in the 2nd century BCE and flourished between the 1st century CE and the 10th, which was a period of relative peace in the history of India during which hundreds of plays were written. Despite its name, Sanskrit theatre was not exclusively in Sanskrit language. Other Indic languages collectively called as Prakrit were also used in addition to Sanskrit.

The earliest-surviving fragments of Sanskrit drama date from the 1st century CE. The wealth of archeological evidence from earlier periods offers no indication of the existence of a tradition of theatre. The Vedas (the earliest Indian literature, from between 1500 and 600 BCE) contain no hint of it; although a small number of hymns are composed in a form of dialogue), the rituals of the Vedic period do not appear to have developed into theatre. The Mahābhāṣya by Patañjali contains the earliest reference to what may have been the seeds of Sanskrit drama. This treatise on grammar from 140 BCE provides a feasible date for the beginnings of theatre in India.

However, although there are no surviving fragments of any drama prior to this date, it is possible that early Buddhist literature provides the earliest evidence for the existence of Indian theater. The Pali suttas (ranging in date from the 5th to 3rd centuries BCE) refer to the existence of troupes of actors (led by a chief actor), who performed dramas on a stage. It is indicated that these dramas incorporated dance, but were listed as a distinct form of performance, alongside dancing, singing, and story recitations.

The major source of evidence for Sanskrit theatre is A Treatise on Theatre (Nātyaśāstra), a compendium whose date of composition is uncertain (estimates range from 200 BCE to 200 CE) and whose authorship is attributed to Bharata Muni. The Treatise is the most complete work of dramaturgy in the ancient world. It addresses acting, dance, music, dramatic construction, architecture, costuming, make-up, props, the organisation of companies, the audience, competitions, and offers a mythological account of the origin of theatre. In doing so, it provides indications about the nature of actual theatrical practices. Sanskrit theatre was performed on sacred ground by priests who had been trained in the necessary skills (dance, music, and recitation) in a [hereditary process]. Its aim was both to educate and to entertain. Characters in Sanskrit plays were important. They were broadly classified into three kinds which are Nayaka(hero), Nayika(heroine) and the Vidusaka(Clown).

An appreciation for the stagecraft and classic Sanskrit drama was seen as an essential part of a sophisticated world view, by the end of the seventh century. Under the patronage of royal courts, performers belonged to professional companies that were directed by a stage manager (sutradhara), who may also have acted. This task was thought of as being analogous to that of a puppeteer—the literal meaning of "sutradhara" is "holder of the strings or threads". The performers were trained rigorously in vocal and physical technique. There were no prohibitions against female performers; companies were all-male, all-female, and of mixed gender. Certain sentiments were considered inappropriate for men to enact, however, and were thought better suited to women. Some performers played characters their own age, while others played ages different from their own (whether younger or older). Of all the elements of theatre, the Treatise gives most attention to acting (abhinaya), which consists of two styles: realistic (lokadharmi) and conventional (natyadharmi), though the major focus is on the latter.

Its drama is regarded as the highest achievement of Sanskrit literature. It used stock characters, such as the hero (nayaka), heroine (nayika), or clown (vidusaka). Actors may have specialised in a particular type. Kālidāsa is arguably considered to be India's greatest Sanskrit dramatist, writing in the ca. 4th century CE-ca. 5th century CE. Three famous romantic plays written by Kālidāsa are the Mālavikāgnimitram (Mālavikā and Agnimitra), Vikramuurvashiiya (Pertaining to Vikrama and Urvashi), and Abhijñānaśākuntala (The Recognition of Shakuntala). The last was inspired by a story in the Mahabharata and is the most famous. It was the first to be translated into English and German. Śakuntalā (in English translation) influenced Goethe's Faust (1808–1832).

The next great Indian dramatist was Bhavabhuti (c. 7th century CE). He is said to have written the following three plays: Malati-Madhava, Mahaviracharita and Uttar Ramacharita. Among these three, the last two cover between them the entire epic of Ramayana. The powerful Indian emperor Harsha (606–648) is credited with having written three plays: the comedy Ratnavali, Priyadarsika, and the Buddhist drama Nagananda.

According to some scholars the earliest form of classical theatre of India was the Sanskrit theatre which came into existence after the development of Greek and Roman theatres in the west. One theory describes this development as an offshoot of Alexander the Great's Indian conquest. The invading army staged Greek-style plays and Indians picked up the performance art. While some scholars argue that traditional Indian theatre predated it, there is a recognition that classical Greek theatre has helped transformed it. The Greek origin of Indian theatre has not received popular acceptance.

Theatre in medieval India
Mid twelfth century – eighteenth century

India's artistic identity is deeply routed within its social, economical, cultural, and religious views. For this reason it is essential to understand Indian cultural practices as they relate directly to performers and performances of this time. Performances including dance, music, and text are an expression of devotion for the Indian culture, so when looking at 'theatre' of this time a broader definition must be ascribed to the word.

Based on the understanding that performing arts are audience-oriented and must continuously adapt to the socio-cultural landscape of their patronage. Northern India managed to retain their cultural traditions in spite of the new Turko-Persian influences. The early thirteenth century marked this change for the Indian culture, where Sanskrit dramas and stage craft had been previously revered by the elites, it was now no longer relevant. This was due to the invading cultures that began to dominate and did not appreciate or understand, and since they did not understand the Sanskrit language it could no longer be held in such a high regard, and as a consequence many theatre artist suffered from neglect.

The commonplace to find performers was in urban centers, because it was there they were able to find work to support themselves. Large temples where home to musical and theatrical shows.

A Bharata Natyshatra also known as the śāstra was written to list costumes, gestures, positions of the body, and make up. It also lists plots that were weighed unsuitable and it also the most completed document. Most of Indian theatre had no scenery. There was usually a few props like a brass lamp.

When the concept of "Theatrical Art" was introduced medieval India was narrating poems.  Bhakti poetry became popular.

During medieval India Bhavabhuti was a famous dramatist, he had three portent plays Malati-Madhava, Magviracharita and the Uttar Ramacharita.

Theatre in India under the British
Under British colonial rule, modern Indian theatre began when a theatre was started in Belgachia. One of the earliest plays composed and staged during this period was Buro Shalikher Ghaare Roa (1860) by Michael Madhusudan Dutt, both in Bengali. Around the same time, Nil Darpan (1858–59, first commercial production in 1872, by Girish Chandra Ghosh at the national theatre in Calcutta) a Bengali play by Dinabandhu Mitra garnered both accolades and controversy for depicting the horror and tragedy of indigo cultivation in rural Bengal, and played a major role in the indigo revolt. Rabindranath Tagore was a pioneering modern playwright who wrote plays noted for their exploration and questioning of nationalism, identity, spiritualism and material greed. His plays are written in Bengali and include Chitra (Chitrangada, 1892), The King of the Dark Chamber (Raja, 1910), The Post Office (Dakghar, 1913), and Red Oleander (Raktakarabi, 1924).

Kalyanam Raghuramaiah, a recipient of the Sangeet Natak Akademi Award, and the Padmashri, was known for the roles of Krishna or Dushyantha, Bhavanisankar, Narada etc. in Telugu theatre. He performed those roles for about 60 years. He indulged in elaborate raga alapana, based on different ragas while rendering padyams. One of the finest method actors, He had the ability to sing padyams and songs through whistle, by putting his finger in mouth and producing the whistle or flute sound (meaning Eela in Telugu). He has acted in various dramas and gave more than 20,000 stage performances. He was called the "Nightingale of the Stage" by Rabindranath Tagore

The British believed that the Indian actors were mystical creatures. They believed they brought them luck and prosperity. The emergent modern Indian theater, which is also referred to as Native theater, features a theatrical approach that has been viewed as an intersection of Indian social space with Western theater formats and conventions. The resulting theatrical space is described to be existing at the material, symbolic, and discursive levels. To resist its use by Indians as an instrument of protest against colonial rule, the British Government imposed the Dramatic Performances Act in 1876.

Indian theatre after Independence (1947–1992)

Improvisation
Improvisational (also known as improv or impro) is a form of theatre in which the actors use improvisational acting techniques to perform spontaneously. Improvisers typically use audience suggestions to guide the performance as they create dialogue, setting, and plot extemporaneously.

Many improvisational actors also work as scripted actors and "improv" techniques are often taught in standard acting classes. The basic skills of listening, clarity, confidence, and performing instinctively and spontaneously are considered important skills for actors to develop.

Improvisational Theatre in India is largely used for educational, interventional and entertainment purposes. The traces of Improvisational theatre in India dates back to the 1990s with the advent of Forum theatre with Janasanskriti under the leadership of Sanjoy Ganguly. After that in 1999, a team from the US with Bev Hoskins and Mary Good introduced Playback theatre to India. Thus Playback theatre and Forum theatre began to take its shape in the remotest parts of India, such as Karur, Chennai, West Bengal, as well as Bangalore too. Yours Truly Theatre, a Bangalore-based group, developed "complete the story", an indigenous format of improvisational theatre developed under the leadership of Ranji David and Nandini Rao in 2006. In 2009, they also developed another form of improvisational theatre called "mushyara theatre".

In the late 1960s Badal Sircar introduced a new form of political theatre called the Third Theatre. Badal Sarkar's anti-establishment experimental theatre created a new genre of social enlightenment. He formed his first Third Theatre Group satabdi, in the year 1967. They used to perform Drama written by Badal Sircar in Anganmancha (theatre in the courtyard) in the Third Theatre form that break away from the tradition of One point view of the Proscenium and urged on the taking theatre to the people.

Improvisational Theatre groups in India:
 Yours Truly Theatre

Improvisational Theatre forms practiced in India:
 Playback theatre
 Theatre of the Oppressed
 Forum theatre

Notable theatres in India in different Indian languages and regions
 Bengali theatre
 Gujarati theatre
 Hindi theatre
 Marathi theatre
 Telugu theatre

Notable people
 

Ancient Indian playwrights
 Bhāsa
 Bhavabhuti
 Kalidasa
 Bharata Muni

Playwrights working under British rule
 Vishnudas Bhave
 Jaishankar Bhojak 'Sundari'
 Bankim Chandra Chatterjee
 Govind Ballal Deval
 Michael Madhusudan Dutt
 Girish Chandra Ghosh
 Annasaheb Kirloskar
 Bhartendu Harishchandra
 Dinabandhu Mitra
 Jaishankar Prasad
 Dwijendralal Ray
 Rabindranath Tagore

Post-Independence theatre-makers
 
 
Notable theatre directors:

 Ebrahim Alkazi
 K.V. Akshara
 Nadira Babbar
 Ram Gopal Bajaj
Ajitesh Bandopadhyay
 Sisir Bhaduri
 Suresh Bhardwaj
 Bijon Bhattacharya
 Raj Bisaria
 Manish Joshi Bismil
 Bibhash Chakraborty
 Chandradasan
 Soumitra Chatterjee
 Neelam Mansingh Chowdhry
 Satyadev Dubey
 Utpal Dutta
 Arvind Gaur
 Sachin Gupta
 Safdar Hashmi
 Rohini Hattangadi
 Shafi Inamdar
 Nemi Chandra Jain
 Shyamanand Jalan
 Prithviraj Kapoor
 Shashi Kapoor
 B.V. Karanth
 Bansi Kaul
 Kader Khan
 Mohan Maharishi
 Ramesh Mehta
 Shaoli Mitra
 Sombhu Mitra
 Shankar Nag
 Balraj Pandit
 Kavalam Narayana Panicker
 Mrityunjay Prabhakar
 Prasanna

 Rathna Shekar Reddy
 Rudraprasad Sengupta
 B.M. Shah
 Naseeruddin Shah

 Gursharan Singh
 Badal Sircar
 Deepan Sivaraman
 Anjan Srivastav
 K.V. Subbanna
 Habib Tanvir Bhopal
 Ratan Thiyam

 Kumara Varma
 Sankar Venkateswaran

Notable playwrights

 
 
 Gurazada Apparao (Telugu)
 Abhimanyu (Malayalam)
 Satish Alekar (Marathi)
 Rambriksh Benipuri (Hindi)
 Datta Bhagat (Marathi)
 Dharamvir Bharati (Hindi)
 Bijon Bhattacharya (Bangla) 
 Anupama Chandrasekhar (English)
 Mohit Chattopadhyay (Bangla) 
 Asif Currimbhoy (English)
 Gurcharan Das (English)
 Mahesh Dattani (English)
 Swadesh Deepak (Hindi)
 Govind Purushottam Deshpande (Marathi)
 Utpal Datta (Bangla)
 Utpal Dutt (Bangla)
 Mahesh Elkunchwar (Marathi)
 Sachin Gupta (Hindi)
 Hasan Imam (Hindi)
 Rajesh Joshi (Hindi)
 Sharad Joshi (Hindi)
 T. P. Kailasam (Kannada, English)
 Sriranga (Kannada)
 Samsa (Kannada)
 Chandrashekhara Kambara (Kannada)
 Prithviraj Kapoor (Hindi), (Urdu), (Pashto), (Bangla)
 Girish Karnad (Kannada)
 Kader Khan (Urdu)
 Tulsi Lahiri (Bangla) 
 Sajitha Madathil (Malayalam)
 Ramesh Mehta (Urdu)
 Piyush Mishra (Hindi)
 Manoj Mitra (Bengali) 
 Torit Mitra (Bengali)
 Narendra Mohan (Hindi)
 Arun Mukherjee (Bangla)
 Manjula Padmanabhan (English)
 Samkutty Pattomkary (Malayalam)
 Vayala Vasudevan Pillai ( Malayalam)
 Mohan Rakesh (Hindi)
 Bhisham Sahni (Hindi)
 Badal Sarkar (Bengali)
 Sarveshwar Dayal Saxena (Hindi)
 B. M. Shah (Urdu)
 Partap Sharma (English)
 Gopal Sharman (English)
 Javed Siddiqui (Urdu)
 Harcharan Singh (Punjabi)
 Hrishikesh Sulabh
 Rajesh Talwar (English)
 Habib Tanvir ( Hindi/ Urdu )
 Vijay Tendulkar (Marathi)
 Shreekumar Varma (English) 
 Surendra Verma (Hindi)
 Asghar Wajahat (Urdu)
 Naren Weiss (English)

Forms of Indian theatre

Traditional Indian theatre

Kutiyattam is the only surviving specimen of the ancient Sanskrit theatre, thought to have originated around the beginning of the Common Era, and is officially recognised by UNESCO as a Masterpiece of the Oral and Intangible Heritage of Humanity. In addition, many forms of Indian folk theatre abound. Bhavai (strolling players) is a popular folk theatre form of Gujarat, said to have arisen in the 14th century AD. Bhaona and Ankiya Nats have been practicing in Assam since the early 16th century which were created and initiated by Mahapurusha Srimanta Sankardeva. Jatra has been popular in Bengal and its origin is traced to the Bhakti movement in the 16th century. Another folk theatre form popular in Haryana, Uttar Pradesh and Malwa region of Madhya Pradesh is Swang, which is dialogue-oriented rather than movement-oriented and is considered to have arisen in its present form in the late 18th – early 19th centuries. Yakshagana is a very popular theatre art in Karnataka and has existed under different names at least since the 16th century. It is semi-classical in nature and involves music and songs based on carnatic music, rich costumes, storylines based on the Mahabharata and Ramayana. It also employs spoken dialogue in-between its songs that gives it a folk art flavour. Kathakali is a form of dance-drama, characteristic of Kerala, that arose in the 17th century, developing from the temple-art plays Krishnanattam and Ramanattam.

 Urdu/Hindustani Theatre 
Urdu Drama evolved from the prevailing dramatic traditions of North India shaping Rahas or Raas as practiced by exponents like Wajid Ali Shah, Nawab of Awadh. His dramatic experiments led to the famous Inder Sabha of Agha Hasan Amanat and later this tradition took the shape of Parsi theatre. Yahudi Ki Ladki (The Jew's Daughter)  by Agha Hashar Kashmiri is culmination of this tradition.

Among all the languages Urdu (which was called Hindi by early writers), along with Gujrati, Marathi and Bengali theatres have kept flourishing and demand for its writers and artists has not subsided by the drama aficionados. All the early gems of Urdu Theatre (performed by Parsi Companies) were made into films. Great works like those by Shakespeare have influenced Modern Urdu tradition to a large extent when Indian, Iranian, Turkish stories and folk was adapted for stage with heavy doses of Urdu Poetry. In modern times writers like Imtiaz Ali Taj, Rafi Peer, Krishan Chander, Manto, Upender Nath Ashk, Ghulam Rabbani, Prof. Mujeeb and many others shaped this tradition.

While Prof Hasan, Ghulam Jeelani, J.N. Kaushal, Shameem Hanfi, Jameel Shaidayi etc. belong to the old generation, contemporary writers like Mujeeb Khan, Javed Siddiqui, Sayeed Alam, Danish Iqbal, Anis Azmi, Aftab Hasnain, Aslam Parvez, Anis Javed, Iqbal Niyazi, Syed Sahil Agha and Zaheer Anwar are few post modern playwrights actively contributing in the field of Urdu Drama.

Zaheer Anwar has kept the flag of Urdu Theatre flying in Kolkata. Unlike the writers of previous generation, Danish iqbal and Zaheer do not write bookish Plays but their work is a product of vigorous performing tradition. Iqbal Niyazi of Mumbai has written several plays in Urdu. His play, "Aur Kitne Jalyanwala BaughU??" won National award other awards. Hence this is the only generation after Amanat and Agha Hashr who actually write for stage and not for libraries.

An upcoming group Aatrangi Pitaara Foundation is actively performing and saving Hindustani Theatre. Their presentation of Anti-National Ghalib written by Danish Iqbal has been well received by the Delhi Theatre enthusiasts. Leading the group, Keshav Raina is developing more Hindustani shows showcasing the rich history and heritage of India.

Indian puppet theatre
Yakshagana is a popular semi-classical theatre art from coastal Karnataka. It uses rich costumes, music, dance, and dialogue. Puppet shows in parts of
Karnataka uses all these elements of yakshagana to depict stories from the Ramayana and Mahabharata.Indian street theatre

 Jan Natya Manch (JANAM)

 Mobile theatre 
Mobile theatres are a kind of popular theatre form that exist mainly in Assam. For staging their plays, theatre groups travel different places with their casts, singers, musicians, dancers and entire crew. Even the tent and chairs for the audience are carried with them. Mobile theatre was first staged on 2 October 1963 in Pathsala, Assam. Achyut Lahkar is known as the father of mobile theatre.

Mobile theatre in Salempur Deoria Eastern Uttar Pradesh is over 900 times played on stage within fifteen years. sanskritiksangam.com is a leading cultural organisation that has been promoting rich Indian culture through regional artists based in Eastern Uttar Pradesh. Since its establishment in 2005, One of its most popular classical-Musical-Dance Drama creation Sanskritik Sangam Salempur, Meghdoot Ki Puravanchal Yatra in Bhojpuri an adaptation of Kalidasa's Meghdootam has done a record 96 shows in cities like Mumbai, Delhi, Rishikesh, Agra, Varanasi,  Patna, Sonpur Mela Gorakhpur, near by areas in eastern UP among others. The creations has won many awards and recognitions for its team through leading organisations Its creations revolve around famous mythological and historical personalities and stories like, Ramayana (7 to 9 days play) 56 places, and 9 days in Surinaam,Guyana, Trinidad &Tobago iof caribbion countries Bhagwata (7 days play) two places, Kabir (32 places), Harishchandra Taramati, (32 Places), Utho Ahilya (36 places) and Sri Krishna (Three places). And also perform popular plays from Hindi literature including Kaptan Sahab (31), Court Marshall (1), Saiyyan Bhaye Kotwal (22), Muvaavaje (2), Bakari (2), Bade Bhai Saheb (63), Kafan(12), Bholaram ka jeev (17), Satgati (2), Boodhi kaaki (3), kakha ga kaa chakkar (7), Jago grahak jaago (3) etc. among other presentations based on famous literary geniuses like Munshi Premchand, Bhikaari Thakur, etc.Manvendra Tripathi as a Director of this team handling the institution .

Notable awards and festivals

Awards

 Sangeet Natak Akademi Award
 Theatre Pasta Theatre Awards
 Kalidas Samman

Festivals of theatre in India

 Prithvi Theatre Festival (Prithvi Festival), held every year since its inception on 3 November, the birth anniversary of its legendary founder Prithviraj Kapoor
 Bharat Rang Mahotsav, NSD, New Delhi
 Jairangam - Jaipur Theatre Festival, Jaipur
 Nandikar's National Theatre Festival
 Purple Umbrella Theater Festival, New Delhi

Notable groups and companies

 Aasakta Kalamanch
 Bhoomika Theatre Group
 Chilsag Chillies Theatre Company
 Dramanon
 Indian People's Theatre Association
 Kerala People's Arts Club
 Manch Theatre
 The Madras Players 
 Nandikar
 Ninasam
 Platform for Action in Creative Theater
 Prithvi Theatre
 Rangayana
 Ranga Shankara
 Samahaara
 Theatre Arts Workshop (TAW)
 Theatre Formation Paribartak
 WeMove Theatre

Notable theatres

 Academy of Fine Arts, Kolkata  (Ranu Mukherjee Mancha)
 Circle Theatre Company (2003)
 Girish Mancha
 Kalidasa Kalakendram
 National School of Drama
 Rabindra Sadan
 Star Theatre
 Surabhi (theatre group)

Notable practitioners who have moved from theatre to films

 Sadashiv Amrapurkar
 Shabana Azmi

 Raj Babbar
 Manoj Bajpayee
 Paran Bandyopadhyay
 Surangana Bandyopadhyay
 Bratya Basu
 Tanikella Bharani
 Suresh Bhardwaj
 Anirban Bhattacharya
 Seema Biswas

 Soumitra Chatterjee
 Prashant Damle
 Deepak Dobriyal
 Utpal Dutt

 Vikram Gokhale
 Neena Gupta
 Rajendra Gupta
 A. K. Hangal
 Shafi Inamdar
 Bharat Jadhav

 Brijendra Kala
 Dada Kondke
 Shahid Kapoor
 Prithviraj Kapoor
 Raj Kapoor
 Shammi Kapoor
 Shashi Kapoor
 Pankaj Kapur
 Girish Karnad
 Satish Kaushik
 Kader Khan
 Shah Rukh Khan
 Kulbhushan Kharbanda
 Anupam Kher
 Swanand Kirkire

 Shriram Lagoo
 Sajitha Madathil
 Shilpi Marwaha
 Piyush Mishra
 Sohrab Modi

 Ananth Nag
 Shankar Nag
 Alok Nath
 Nana Patekar
 Smita Patil
 Om Puri

 Rajkumar
 Kangana Ranaut
 Paresh Rawal
 Rathna Shekar Reddy

 Balraj Sahni
 Ashok Saraf
 Kaushik Sen
 Riddhi Sen
 Naseeruddin Shah
 Ratna Pathak Shah
 Om Shivpuri
 Sudha Shivpuri
 Shilpa Shukla
 Nawazuddin Siddiqui

 Pankaj Tripathi
 Ashish Vidyarthi
 Rajpal Yadav

Training
 Bhartendu Academy of Dramatic Arts
 National School of Drama
 Madhya Pradesh School of Drama

See also
 Malayalam drama

References

Notes

Sources

 Banham, Martin, ed. 1998. The Cambridge Guide to Theatre. Cambridge: Cambridge UP. .
 Brandon, James R. 1981. Introduction. In Baumer and Brandon (1981, xvii–xx).
 ---, ed. 1997. The Cambridge Guide to Asian Theatre. 2nd, rev. ed. Cambridge: Cambridge UP. .
 Brockett, Oscar G. and Franklin J. Hildy. 2003. History of the Theatre. Ninth edition, International edition. Boston: Allyn and Bacon. .
 Baumer, Rachel Van M., and James R. Brandon, eds. 1981. Sanskrit Theatre in Performance. Delhi: Motilal Banarsidass, 1993. .
 Richmond, Farley. 1998. "India." In Banham (1998, 516–525).
 Richmond, Farley P., Darius L. Swann, and Phillip B. Zarrilli, eds. 1993. Indian Theatre: Traditions of Performance. U of Hawaii P. .
 Sharma, Shrikrishna, ed. 1996. Rangkarmi. Cultural Societies of Rajasthan. (1996, 139)

Further reading

 Indian Drama in English by Ananda Lal, IWE Online, 13 May 2022.

 The Indian theatre, by Mulk Raj Bansal, Published by D. Dobson, 1950.
 Theatre in India, by Balwant Gargi. Published by Theatre Arts Books, 1962.
 A panorama of theatre in India, by Som Benegal. Published by Popular Prakashan [for] Indian Council for Cultural Relations (ICCR), 1968.
 Roy, Pinaki. "Bratya Basu's Boma: Bombing the Coloniser-supervised Chronicle". Postcolonial Indian Drama in English and English Translation: Reading Themes and Techniques. Eds. Sarkar, J., and U. De. New Delhi: Authors Press, 2017. pp. 287–300.   
 Indian Theatre: Traditions of Performance, by Farley P. Richmond, Darius L. Swann, Phillip B. Zarrilli. Motilal Banarsidass Publ., 1993. .
 Indian theatre: theatre of origin, theatre of freedom, by Ralph Yarrow. Routledge, 2001. .
 The Oxford companion to Indian theatre, by Ananda Lal. Oxford University Press, 2004. .
 jagrancityplus
 A History of the Jana Natya Manch: Plays for the People" by Arjun Ghosh; Published by SAGE Publications India, New Delhi; 2012

India
Indian culture
Performing arts in India
Classical theatre of india